Breccia Peak may refer to mountains/peaks:
 Breccia Peak (Wyoming)
 Breccia Peak (British Columbia)
 Breccia Peak (Washington)